Tama News-Herald was a regional newspaper based in Tama, Iowa. The paper was in circulation between 1869 and 2020.

History
The paper was started in 1869 with the name The Tama Citizen. From 1875 to 1925 it was published under the name The Tama Herald, and the publisher was F.J.M. Wonser. 

In 1925, the paper was renamed as Tama News-Herald, and the first issue under this name appeared on 8 January. The first publisher of Tama News-Herald was Tama Print Co. It was part of Ogden Newspapers until May 2020 when it was merged with Toledo Chronicle, another paper owned by Ogden Newspapers.

References

1869 establishments in Iowa
2020 disestablishments in Iowa
Defunct newspapers published in Iowa
Publications established in 1869
Publications disestablished in 2020